Periboeum paucispinum is a species of beetle in the family Cerambycidae. It was described by Lameere in 1890.

References

Elaphidiini
Beetles described in 1890